Rules of engagement are orders to military and security forces.

Rules of Engagement may also refer to:

Film
 Rules of Engagement (film), a 2000 military drama 
 Waco: The Rules of Engagement, a 1997 documentary

Literature
 Rules of Engagement (Elizabeth Moon novel)
 Rules of Engagement (Star Trek novel), a novel by Peter Morwood
 Rules of Engagement (Sir John Fielding novel)
 The Rules of Engagement, a novel by Canadian writer Catherine Bush

Television
 Rules of Engagement (TV series)
 Rules of Engagement (1989 TV series), a 1989 British television series
 "Rules of Engagement" (DS9 episode)
 "Rules of Engagement" (Stargate SG-1)
 "Rules of Engagement" (Will & Grace) 
 "Rules of Engagement", an episode of The Dresden Files
 "Rules of Engagement", an episode of When Calls the Heart

See also

 
 Engagement (disambiguation)
 Engage (disambiguation)
 Rule (disambiguation)